Grižane Castle is a ruined castle and site near Grižane in Vinodol, in the northern part of the Adriatic coast, western Croatia. The castle of Grižane had an odd, rectangular form with circular towers, and this irregularity was caused by the peculiar structure of the field. 

In the medieval age it was a strategic point in Vinodol valley, but it was damaged in an earthquake in 1323. Its owners were members of the Frankopan family.

Castles in Croatia
Ruined castles in Croatia
Buildings and structures in Primorje-Gorski Kotar County